Asaduzzaman Khan (born 31 December 1950) is a Bangladesh Awami League politician. He became the Member of Parliament for Dhaka-12 in 2014, being re-elected in 2018. He currently serves as Minister of Home Affairs.

Early life 
Khan was born on 31 December 1950 in Monipuripara, Dhaka, East Bengal, Pakistan. His home district is Dohar, Dhaka. In 1965, he completed his SSC from Tejgaon Polytechnic High school (Now Tejgaon Government High School) and in 1967, he completed his HSC from Jagannath College which is among the reputed colleges today.

Career 
Khan was a member of the Mukti Bahini and fought in the Bangladesh Liberation war in 1971. He served in sector 2 under Captain Abdul Halim Chowdhury. He was elected to Parliament in December 2008. From 2009 to 2013, he served in the Parliamentary Standing Committee on Housing and Public Works. He was a member of the Bangladesh Press Council. He founded the Dohar Padma College. He served as the President of the Ispahani School and College and Tejgaon College, two reputed colleges (both founded after Bangladesh's liberation war). He is a senate member of the Sher-e-Bangla Agricultural University. He was re-elected in January 2014 and on 12 January 2014, he was made the State Minister of Home Affairs. On 14 July 2015 he was made the Minister of Home Affairs.

References

Further reading
 
 
 

Living people
1950 births
Awami League politicians
Mukti Bahini personnel
9th Jatiya Sangsad members
10th Jatiya Sangsad members
11th Jatiya Sangsad members
Home Affairs ministers of Bangladesh
State Ministers of Home Affairs (Bangladesh)
Place of birth missing (living people)